Professor Basimah Yusuf Butrus (or Basmah Yousif Putros; born 1963 in Erbil, Iraqi Kurdistan) is an Iraqi Assyrian politician who was Minister of Science and Technology in the Iraqi Transitional Government from May 2005 until May 2006. She was then the only Christian Minister in Iraq. She graduated from Salahaddin University-Erbil, earning master's degree in biochemistry. Religiously, Basmah belongs to the Chaldean Catholic Church and politically is part of the Assyrian Democratic Movement. She is a human rights activist in Iraqi Kurdistan and is a member of the Catholic humanitarian organization named Caritas.

Basimah was elected into the Iraq parliament on March 8, 2010. She was the only Christian woman in the parliament.

References

1963 births
Living people
Chaldean Catholics
Iraqi Eastern Catholics
People from Erbil
Assyrian Democratic Movement politicians
Members of the Council of Representatives of Iraq
Government ministers of Iraq
21st-century Iraqi women politicians
21st-century Iraqi politicians
Salahaddin University-Erbil alumni
Women government ministers of Iraq